Peter Merloni (July 22, 1904 – September 1967) was a professional football player who spent a season in the National Football League with the Boston Bulldogs in 1929. Prior to playing professional football, Merloni attended and played college football at the University of Notre Dame.

Notes

1904 births
1967 deaths
Boston Bulldogs (NFL) players
Notre Dame Fighting Irish football players
Place of birth missing